Collyriclidae is a family of flatworms belonging to the order Plagiorchiida.

Genera:
 Collyricium Kossack, 1911
 Collyricloides Vaucher, 1969
 Collyriclum Ward, 1917

References

Plagiorchiida